Thomas Kling (June 5, 1957 – April 1, 2005) was a German poet.

Life 
Thomas Kling was born in Bingen am Rhein, grew up in Hilden and went to school in Düsseldorf. He studied philology in Cologne, Düsseldorf and Vienna and lived in Finland for a certain period. Since 1983 he presented his poems on public performances – first in Vienna, than in the Rhineland. Later he performed together with the jazz percussionist .

Kling lived with his wife Ute Langanky, a painter, on the museum area of Hombroich (a former rocket station) near Neuss. In 2005 he died in Dormagen of lung cancer. He was buried in Neuss-Holzheim.

Poetry 
Thomas Kling was an important poet in contemporary German literature. He was influenced by authors like Friederike Mayröcker, Ernst Jandl, Paul Celan, Hans Carl Artmann and Konrad Bayer. The structure and the layout of his poems were often dominated by the needs of his performances. He was member of the German PEN-centre and of the Deutsche Akademie für Sprache und Dichtung (German Academy for Language and Poetry).

Awards 
 1986: Förderpreis für Literatur der Landeshauptstadt Düsseldorf in Northrhine-Westphalia
 1989: Promotion Prize of Northrhine-Westphalia
 1990: Rolf Dieter Brinkmann Grant of Cologne
 1991: Promotion Prize of the arts circle in the Federal Association of German Industry
 1993: Else Lasker Schüler Prize for Poetry
 1997: Peter Huchel Prize
 2001: Ernst Jandl Prize
 2005: Poetry Prize of the Stadtsparkasse Düsseldorf

Works 
 der zustand vor dem untergang (the situation before the breakup), Düsseldorf 1977
 erprobung herzstärkender mittel (testing of heart strengthening means), Düsseldorf 1986
 geschmacksverstärker (flavour enhancer), Frankfurt am Main 1989
 verkehrsfunk (traffic message channel), 1989
 brennstabm (fuel rod / fuel rodz), Frankfurt am Main 1991
 nacht.sicht.gerät (night.vision.device), Frankfurt am Main 1993
 wände machn (making walls / makin walls), Münster 1994
 morsch (decayed), Frankfurt am Main 1996
 Itinerar (itinerary), Frankfurt am Main 1997
 Wolkenstein. Mobilisierun' (claude stone. mobilisatio', Münster 1997
 GELÄNDE camouflage (terrain camouflage), Münster 1997 (together with Ute Langanky)
 Fernhandel (long distance trade), Köln 1999
 Botenstoffe (messenger substrates), Köln 2001
 Sondagen (sondages), Köln 2002
 Auswertung der Flugdaten (analysis of flight data), Köln 2005
 Gesammelte Gedichte (collected poems), Köln 2006
 Das brennende Archiv - Brevier. (ed. Ute Langanky and Norbert Wehr). Suhrkamp, Berlin 2012 (= suhrkamp taschenbuch 4351), .

Editor 

 Friederike Mayröcker: Benachbarte Metalle, Frankfurt am Main 1998
 Sabine Scho: Thomas Kling entdeckt Sabine Scho, Hamburg [u.a.] 2001
 Sprachspeicher. 200 Gedichte auf deutsch vom achten bis zum zwanzigsten Jahrhundert, Köln 2001

Translations 

 Gaius Valerius Catullus: Das Haar der Berenice, Ostfildern vor Stuttgart 1997

Literature 
 Heinz-Norbert Jocks: Thomas Kling. Bilderfindungen, Un entretien de Heinz-Norbert Jocks, revised in: Schreibheft. Zeitschrift für Literatur, Edition 96, Essen 2021, p. 146-155.
 Heinz-Norbert Jocks: Bilderfindungen, Ein Gespräch mit Thomas Kling, in: Kunstforum International, Cologne 1998, No. 140, p. 238–253.
 Heinz-Norbert Jocks: Wörter aus dem Vulkan, In: General-Anzeiger, Bonn 1994,23./24. July 1994.
 Heinz-Norbert Jocks: Das Genie, In: Überblick Magazin, Düsseldorf, 1986, Edition 11, November, p. 36–38.
 Heinz-Norbert Jocks: Ein Wahlverwandter der Dadaisten, In: Düsseldorfer Hefte, Düsseldorf, 1986, 1. October 1986, Edition 11, p. 13-14.

References

 Thomas Kling, München 2000.
 Thomas Kling – Karl-Heinrich Müller, Köln 2004.
 Thomas Kling ist tot. Notizen zu einem deutschen Dichter (In: Theo Breuer, Aus dem Hinterland. Lyrik nach 2000, Sistig/Eifel 2005, S. 101-114).
 Hubert Winkels: Der Stimmen Ordnung. Über Thomas Kling, Köln 2005.

External links 
 At his publishing house Dumont, German
 Interview on literaturkritik.de, German
 Review of his book “Auswertung der Flugdaten” in the newspaper “Die Zeit”, German

Added category tag for membership in the German Academy of Language and Literature

1957 births
2005 deaths
People from Bingen am Rhein
German male poets
20th-century German poets
German-language poets
Members of the German Academy for Language and Literature
Deaths from lung cancer
20th-century German male writers